An Obelisk is the sixth studio album by Titus Andronicus, released on June 21, 2019, through Merge Records. The album was produced by Bob Mould and recorded at Steve Albini’s Electrical Audio studio, and it is also the band’s shortest album. The album's "louder, more aggressive style" received mostly positive reviews, including Consequence of Sound calling it "easily their most digestible and contained album yet".

Track listing

References 

2019 albums
Titus Andronicus (band) albums
Merge Records albums